Agios Epiktitos is a village in Cyprus, located  east of Kyrenia. Agios Epiktitos, is under the de facto control of Northern Cyprus.The village was named after an ascetic monk who fled the Saracens in Palestine in the 9th Century and was a colleague of Saint Ambrose of Kyrenia who gave his name to a village close by.

Turkish Cypriot Agios Epiktitos Municipality was founded in 1980.

Culture, sports, and tourism
Turkish Cypriot Düzkaya Sports Club, located in Agios Epiktitos, was founded in 1958, and now in Cyprus Turkish Football Association (CTFA) K-PET 1st League.

Twin towns – sister cities

Agios Epiktitos is twinned with:
  Altınova, Turkey
  Zabrat, Azerbaijan (since 2005)
  Kaş, Antalya, Turkey (since 2015)

References

Communities in Kyrenia District
Populated places in Girne District
Municipalities of Northern Cyprus